The reflex inguinal ligament is a triangular fibrous band that arises from the lacunar ligament and the pubis and passes diagonally upward and medially behind the superficial inguinal ring and in front of the inguinal falx to join with the linea alba.

The reflected part of the inguinal ligament is an extension from the lateral crus of the superficial inguinal ring upwards and medially behind the external oblique muscle  but in front of the conjoint tendon.

Pelvis
Ligaments